Komako is a feminine Japanese given name. Notable people with the name include:

, Japanese actress
, Japanese suffragist, actress, dancer, theatre manager and magazine editor

Japanese feminine given names